Rebordelo may refer to the following places in Portugal:

, a parish in the municipality of Amarante
, a parish in the municipality of Vinhais